The 1825 Maine gubernatorial election took place on September 12, 1825. Incumbent Democratic-Republican Governor Albion Parris won re-election to a fifth term.

Results

References

Gubernatorial
1825
Maine
September 1825 events